Bystrany may refer to:

Bystrany (Slovakia), a Slovakian municipality
Bystřany, a town in the Czech Republic